Askadeh (also known as Askīdeh) is a village in Lakan Rural District, in the Central District of Rasht County, Gilan Province, Iran. At the 2006 census, its population was 90, in 21 families.

References

External links 
 Askadeh Map and Weather

Populated places in Rasht County